Eduarda Kraisch (born ) is a retired Brazilian female volleyball player. She was part of the Brazil women's national volleyball team.

She participated at the 2010 Women's Pan-American Volleyball Cup.

References

1993 births
Living people
Brazilian women's volleyball players
Place of birth missing (living people)
21st-century Brazilian women